The United States Army's Warrant Officer Career College (USAWOCC), located at Fort Rucker, Alabama, functions as Training and Doctrine Command's executive agent for all warrant officer training and education in the U.S. Army. The Warrant Officer Career College is part of the Army University and Combined Arms Center, headquartered at Fort Leavenworth, Kansas.

The Warrant Officer Career College develops and administers active and reserve component warrant officer courses to include the Warrant Officer Candidate School, Warrant Officer Basic Course, Warrant Officer Advanced Course, Warrant Officer Intermediate Level Education, and the Warrant Officer Senior Service Education.

Notes and references

See also
Staff college
United States Army War College
United States Army Command and General Staff College

External links
Warrant Officer Career College (Official website)
Army Warrant Officer History since 1918 Warrant Officer Heritage Foundation

United States Army schools
Warrant officers